Systasea zampa, the Arizona powdered-skipper, is a species of spread-wing skipper in the butterfly family Hesperiidae. It is found in Central America and North America.

The MONA or Hodges number for Systasea zampa is 3938.

References

Further reading

External links

 

Pyrginae
Articles created by Qbugbot